XHRRR-FM is a noncommercial radio station in Encarnación de Díaz, Jalisco, Mexico, serving the Aguascalientes area. The station is owned by Grupo Radiofónico ZER, and its permit is held by Rodrigo Rodríguez Reyes. XHRRR broadcasts from a tower on Cerro de los Gallos, a mountain on the Aguascalientes-Jalisco border used to provide television service to Aguascalientes.

References

Radio stations in Jalisco
Spanish-language radio stations